The Palm Tree is a Grade II listed public house at 127 Grove Road, Mile End, and is within Mile End Park.

It was built in 1935 for Truman's Brewery and designed by Eedle and Meyers.

It was Grade II listed in 2015 by Historic England.

The pub was used as a filming location during the TV series Luther for the third episode of the third series and the 2010 short film Half Hearted.

References

Pubs in the London Borough of Tower Hamlets
Grade II listed pubs in London
Mile End
Grade II listed buildings in the London Borough of Tower Hamlets